Alcis pallens is a moth of the family Geometridae. It is found in Taiwan.

References

Moths described in 1978
Boarmiini
Moths of Taiwan